The NRL Under-20s (known commercially as the Holden Cup due to sponsorship from Holden) was the top league of professional rugby league for players aged 20 years or younger in Australasia. Contested by sixteen teams, the Under-20s competition commenced in 2008 and was originally known as the Toyota Cup. The competition runs parallel to Australasia's professional competition, the National Rugby League, with NYC matches played immediately prior to the NRL games. Similar to the NRL, the NYC enforces a salary cap and puts a heavy focus on life outside football for the players.

The New Zealand Warriors were the most successful club in the competition's short history, with three premierships from four Grand Final appearances; in 2010, 2011 and 2014. In 2018, the NRL Under-20s was replaced by state-based under-20s competitions in New South Wales and Queensland.

History
The NRL Under-20s succeeded the Jersey Flegg Cup in 2008, which existed from 1961 to 2007. The competition was administered by the New South Wales Rugby League as an under-19s competition, until it was changed to an under-20s competition in 1998.
On October 28, 2016 it was announced that the 2017 season will be the last for the NRL Under-20s. It was to be replaced by stronger State-based competitions in NSW and QLD, these being the reformed Jersey Flegg Cup in NSW and the new Hastings Deering Colts in Queensland.

Teams

Premiership winners

Team Performance

Awards

Player of the Year
The National Youth Competition Player of the Year award is the premier individual award in the National Youth Competition. The voting for the award is similar to the Dally M Medal voting, where after each National Youth Competition game 3 points are awarded to the best player on ground, 2 points to the second and 1 point to the third. As of 2017, every winner of the award has gone on to play first grade in the NRL. The inaugural winner was Ben Hunt from the Brisbane Broncos in 2008. Hunt is also the youngest player to win the award, at age 18 years, 5 months and 13 days.

Jack Gibson Medal

The Jack Gibson Medal is awarded to the man of the match of the Toyota Cup grand final. The award is named after legendary rugby league coach, Jack Gibson. Gibson, who guided Eastern Suburbs to premierships in 1974 and 1975, the Parramatta Eels to three successive premierships from 1981 to 1983 and was named coach of the Team of the Century, died in 2008.

Television coverage

Australia
 Free to air: Channel 9 showed the Grand Final as part of the Grand Final Coverage.
 Subscription television: FOX Sports show 2 games live every weekend, live coverage of the Toyota Cup precede Fox Sports' Super Saturday and Sunday live NRL coverage.

New Zealand
 All New Zealand Warriors home games in the U20's competition are shown live by Sky NZ. Māori Television also broadcasts Ngāti NRL, a series that focuses on young Māori and Pacific Islanders who travel to Australia and play in the Toyota Cup.

See also

List of records in the National Youth Competition (rugby league)
Rugby League Competitions in Australia

References

External links
 

 
Rugby league competitions in Australia
Rugby league competitions in New Zealand
2008 establishments in Australia
Sports leagues established in 2008
Youth sport in Australia